In computer science, a computer is CPU-bound (or compute-bound) when the time for it to complete a task is determined principally by the speed of the central processor: processor utilization is high, perhaps at 100% usage for many seconds or minutes. Interrupts generated by peripherals may be processed slowly, or indefinitely delayed.

The concept of CPU-bounding was developed during early computers, when data paths between computer components were simpler, and it was possible to visually see one component working while another was idle. Example components were CPU, tape drives, hard disks, card-readers, and printers. Computers that predominantly used peripherals were characterized as I/O bound. Establishing that a computer is frequently CPU-bound implies that upgrading the CPU or optimizing code will improve the overall computer performance.

With the advent of multiple buses, parallel processing, multiprogramming, preemptive scheduling, advanced graphics cards, advanced sound cards and generally, more decentralized loads, it became less likely to identify one particular component as always being a bottleneck. It is likely that a computer's bottleneck shifts rapidly between components. Furthermore, in modern computers it is possible to have 100% CPU utilization with minimal impact to another component. Finally, tasks required of modern computers often emphasize quite different components, so that resolving a bottleneck for one task may not affect the performance of another. For these reasons, upgrading a CPU does not always have a dramatic effect. The concept of being CPU-bound is now one of many factors considered in modern computer performance.

See also
 I/O-bound
 Memory-bound

External links
 CPU bound description
 Stackoverflow CPU bound terminology

Computer performance